Martna was a rural municipality of Estonia, in Lääne County. It had a population of 760 (2016) and an area of 269 km².

Villages
Martna Parish has 33 villages:

Allikotsa, Ehmja, Enivere, Jõesse, Kaare, Kaasiku, Kabeli, Kasari, Keravere, Keskküla, Keskvere, Kesu, Kirna, Kokre, Kurevere, Laiküla, Liivaküla, Martna, Männiku, Niinja, Nõmme, Ohtla, Oonga, Putkaste, Rannajõe, Rõude, Soo-otsa, Suure-Lähtru, Tammiku, Tuka, Uusküla, Väike-Lähtru, Vanaküla.

References

Some of the content of this article comes from the Estonian Wikipedia article Martna vald.

External links
Official website 

Former municipalities of Estonia